Kecskeméti Testedző Egyesület  is a Hungarian handball club from Kecskemét, that played in the  Nemzeti Bajnokság I, the top level championship in Hungary.

Crest, colours, supporters

Naming history

Kits

Sports Hall information
Name: – Messzi István Sportcsarnok
City: – Kecskemét
Capacity: – 1200
Address: – 6000, Olimpia u. 1/A

Management

Current squad
Squad for the 2021–22 season

Transfers
Transfers for the 2021–22 season

Joining 

  Hiramoto Keisuke (CB) from  Zeekstar Tokyo
  Enomoto Yuga (RB) from  Tsukuba University
  Máté Menyhárt (LW) from  Budai Farkasok KKUK
  Barnabás Marczika (GK) on loan from  Pick Szeged U22
  Bence Vetési (CB) on loan from  Pick Szeged U22
  Marcell Lőrincz (LP) on loan from  Pick Szeged U22
  Miklós Karai (LP) on loan from  Ferencvárosi TC
  Xavér Deményi (GK) on loan from  Ferencvárosi TC

Leaving 

  Olivér Kiss (GK) to  Békési FKC
  Richárd Kátai (RB) to  Mezőkövesdi KC
  Norbert Tóth (LB) to  Ceglédi KKSE

Previous Squads

Top Scorers

Recent seasons

Seasons in Nemzeti Bajnokság I: 6
Seasons in Nemzeti Bajnokság I/B: 17

Former club members

Notable former players

 Sándor Bajusz
 Dávid Bakos
 Róbert Berta
 Balázs Bíró
 Máté Halász
 Zoltán Hímer
 Marinko Kekezović
 Gergő Lókodi
 Zoltán Miss
 Ádám Országh
 Bence Simon
 Norbert Sutka
Péter Szabó
 Edmond Tóth
 Milán Varsandán
 Vladislav Veselinov
 Nikola Knežević
 Sebastian Prieto
 Enomoto Yuga (2021–)
 Hiramoto Keisuke (2021–)
 Janko Škrbić
 Borislav Basarić
 Ilija Belojević
 Dejan Dobardžijev
 Vitomir Kalić
 Goran Vujasin
 Patrik Hruščák
 Andrej Petro
 Michal Shejbal

Former coaches

References

External links
  
 

Hungarian handball clubs
Kecskemét